The minister responsible for Constitutional Affairs was a position included in the Executive Council of Manitoba from 1986 to 2016. The position was not a full cabinet portfolio, and had always been held by a minister with other cabinet responsibilities, typically the provincial Minister of Justice, Attorney-General and Keeper of the Great Seal.

List of Ministers responsible for Constitutional Affairs

References

Constitutional Affairs, Minister responsible for